The Devonian Brallier Formation is a mapped bedrock unit in Pennsylvania, Maryland, West Virginia, and Virginia.

Description
The Brallier Formation was described by Charles Butts in 1918 as a fine-grained, siliceous shale with few fine-grained sandstone layers, from outcrops in central Pennsylvania.  Others expanded usage of the term to rocks in other states.

Stratigraphy
The Brallier is roughly equivalent to the Scherr Formation.

The contact with the underlying Harrell Formation is generally gradational.

Fossils
Hasson and Dennison reported the following fossils from outcrops of the lower Brallier at Keyser, West Virginia, Ridgeville, West Virginia, and McCoole, Maryland:
Bivalvia:  Buchiola retrostriata, Paracardium doris, Pterochaenia fragilis
Cephalopoda:  Bactrites, Orthoceras filosum
Cricoconarida (class of Mollusca):  Styliolina fissurella
Annelida:  Pteridichnites biseriatus

Notable Exposures
Type locality is at a railway station 6 miles northeast of Everett, Bedford County, Pennsylvania.

A large exposure is located in Huntingdon, Pennsylvania, along the ramp from U.S. Route 22 west to Route 26 north.

Another good exposure is on the Pennsylvania Railroad bed just west of Altoona, Pennsylvania.

Age
Relative age dating places the Brallier in the late Devonian.

References

Geologic formations of Maryland
Geologic formations of Pennsylvania
Geologic formations of Virginia
Geologic formations of West Virginia
Devonian System of North America
Devonian Maryland
Devonian geology of Pennsylvania
Devonian geology of Virginia
Devonian West Virginia
Frasnian Stage
Famennian Stage
Shale formations of the United States